The Or-Thora Synagogue is a synagogue located in the Hara (old city) of the city of Tunis.

History 
It was completed in the early 1930s, prior to World War II. It was designed by architects Aimé Krief and Jean Sebag. Habib Bourguiba, who served as the President of Tunisia from 1957 to 1987, visited the synagogue on February 12, 1957.

Decline
After the departure of most of the Tunisian Jews for Israel and France following the anti-Jewish riots during the Six-Day War, which included the burning of the Torah Scrolls at the synagogue, religious services stopped being offered at the synagogue. It is currently not in use.

There are ongoing discussions among the Tunisian Jewish community and the residents of the Hafsia to turn the Or-Thora Synagogue into a museum of the Hara, with a project led by Leila Ben Gacem and a team of architects from the NGO Association de sauvegarde de la médina de Tunis, with the aim to save the synagogue from total degradation.

References

See also
List of synagogues in Tunisia
History of the Jews in Tunisia

Religious buildings and structures in Tunis
Former synagogues in Tunisia
Synagogues completed in the 1930s
Jews and Judaism in Tunis